Binhai Port railway is a single-track branch line in Yancheng, Jiangsu, China. It is currently under construction.

Route 
The line starts at Binhaigang railway station on the Qingdao–Yancheng railway and heads east, terminating at the eastern coast.

References 

Railway lines in China